Isabelle Pritchard is an Australian rules footballer playing for the  in the AFL Women's league. On debut, Pritchard collected 6 disposals, 1 mark and 3 tackles. It was revealed that Pritchard had signed a contract extension with the club on 16 June 2021, after playing 4 games for the club that season.

Statistics
Statistics are correct to the end of the 2021 season.

|- style="background-color: #eaeaea"
! scope="row" style="text-align:center" | 2021
|style="-*+-*+-+text-align:center;"|
| 20 || 4 || 0 || 1 || 14 || 20 || 34 || 6 || 9 || 0.0 || 0.3 || 3.5 || 5.0 || 8.5 || 1.5 || 2.3 || 0
|- 
|- class="sortbottom"
! colspan=3| Career
! 4
! 0
! 1
! 14
! 20
! 34
! 6
! 9
! 0.0
! 0.3
! 3.5
! 5.0
! 8.5
! 1.5
! 2.3
! 0
|}

Personal life
Pritchard supported the Western Bulldogs growing up, and cited her brother as having an influence on her experience with football as he introduced her to the game. 

She was educated at Melbourne Girls College.

References

External links

2002 births
Living people
Western Bulldogs (AFLW) players
Western Jets players (NAB League Girls)
Australian rules footballers from Victoria (Australia)